Santee Indian Mound and Fort Watson is a historic archaeological site located in North Santee, Clarendon County, South Carolina, near Summerton. Santee Indian Mound was part of a Santee mound village complex; it was probably a burial and/or temple mound, likely constructed in some cultural period between 1200–1500.

In 1780, Francis Marion and Light Horse Harry Lee decided to capture the fort in the Siege of Fort Watson. Fort Watson was the first fortified British military outpost in South Carolina recaptured by patriot forces after the British occupation of 1780. There are no remains of Fort Watson on the site.

It was listed in the National Register of Historic Places in 1969. Today it is located in the Santee National Wildlife Refuge.

References

Archaeological sites on the National Register of Historic Places in South Carolina
Buildings and structures in Clarendon County, South Carolina
National Register of Historic Places in Clarendon County, South Carolina